James William Gouk (born April 15, 1946) is a Canadian politician.

Born in Toronto, Ontario, Gouk began his political career out west as an alderman in Castlegar, British Columbia. Gouk would enter federal politics in 1993 when he was elected into the House of Commons of Canada. In the 1993 Canadian federal election he was elected in Kootenay West—Revelstoke with the Reform Party of Canada. In the 1997 Canadian federal election he was elected out of the West Kootenay—Okanagan riding. In the 2000 Canadian federal election, Gouk was elected after joining the Canadian Alliance from the Kootenay—Boundary—Okanagan riding. He was elected a fourth time in the 2004 Canadian federal election in the riding of Southern Interior, this time for the Conservative Party of Canada. An air traffic controller, businessman and realtor, he has been an opposition critic of Transport, Public Works and Government Services, Labour, and Via Rail before retiring from politics at the dissolution of parliament prior to the 2006 federal election.

External links 

1946 births
Living people
Canadian Alliance MPs
Conservative Party of Canada MPs
Members of the House of Commons of Canada from British Columbia
People from Castlegar, British Columbia
Politicians from Toronto
Reform Party of Canada MPs
Air traffic controllers
21st-century Canadian politicians